Atasi Barua (4 September 1921 – 26 June 2016) was one of the prominent Indian women painters of the 20th century. Her work has been exhibited in places like Colombo, Tehran, Cairo, Bangkok and Tokyo, apart from India, Nepal, and Sri Lanka. Her paintings usually contain classical themes while her techniques also show a mix of realism. There are a lot of references to Buddhism that can be found in her art.

Early life and education 
Atasi Barua was born on 4 September 1921 the daughter of Sarojbasini Devi and Asit Kumar Haldar in West Bengal. She was the great-grand niece of Rabindranath Tagore who in fact named her. She was born at Shantiniketan. She studied at La Martiniere College in Lucknow.

Career in art 
She started painting at an young age, to cope with the early demise of her mother. Her father, who was a well-known painter himself, constantly encouraged and motivated her passion. She trained herself in various techniques and soon become a talented artist.

After her marriage to Dr Arabinda Barua who was a Buddhist scholar, her exposure to Buddhism gave her immense inspiration, which can be seen from her paintings. Her paintings revolve around portraying the life of Buddha, the cave paintings of Ajanta, and many other themes.

She won cash reward at the 11th Annual Exhibition of the Academy of Fine Arts, Kolkata, after which she started getting international attention for her paintings. Her paintings were also held in solo exhibitions in Kolkata, where she was praised by many critics like O. C. Ganguly and Abani C. Banerjee.

She and her husband traveled a lot and attended many conferences in South Asia. She also made portraits of many well-known personalities and scholars that she met, and also got them signed. Some of them are Jamini Roy, Nandalal Bose, B. R. Ambedkar, Ho Chi Minh, O. C. Gangooly, Nabanita Dev Sen and Kalidas Nag.

The majority of her artwork were line drawings. Drawing inspiration from Lord Buddha’s life, she chronicled his life in 12 paintings after she was requested to do so by the Maha Bodhi Society who then published them in a pictorial book. She was also commissioned by the Digambar Jain Temple to do a series of paintings on the 23rd Tirthankara, Parshvanatha.

References 

Indian women painters
20th-century Indian women artists
1921 births
2016 deaths
Buddhist artists
La Martinière College, Lucknow alumni
Women artists from West Bengal